Alisen Down (born January 3, 1976) is a Canadian film and television actress. She is best known for her roles as Miranda Feigelsteen in the paranormal drama series Mysterious Ways (2000—2002) and as Olivia Kirschner in the Sy-Fy series 12 Monkeys (2015—2018).

Early life

Down was born in Langley, British Columbia. She showed an interest for acting early, and during her younger years she used to write and produce her own plays. After she graduated from H. D. Stafford Secondary School, Down studied at the American Academy of Dramatic Arts in California, and then the British American Dramatic Academy in Oxford. She is married to actor David Richmond-Peck, whom she met while working on the series Robson Arms.

Career
Down's most famous appearance is most likely in the TV series Mysterious Ways, where she played the role of Miranda, a physics graduate student who, together with Professor Declan Dunn (often the enthusiast behind the investigations) and psychiatrist Dr. Peggy Fowler (the other skeptic besides Miranda), tries to solve a range of mysterious or paranormal events. One of her high-profile roles was that of Jean Barolay in the re-imagined Battlestar Galactica series.

Filmography

Film

Television

Awards/Nominations

References

External links

 AlisenDown.com website (Official)
 
 Alisen Down on Northern Stars - Canadians in the Movies

1976 births
Living people
People from Langley, British Columbia (district municipality)
Canadian film actresses
Canadian television actresses
Canadian Screen Award winners
20th-century Canadian actresses
21st-century Canadian actresses
Actresses from British Columbia
American Academy of Dramatic Arts alumni